Utah State Route 4 may refer to:

 Utah State Route 4 (1962-1977), the former state highway designation (legislative overlay) for Interstate 70 in Utah, United States, which runs through Millard, Sevier, Emery, and Grand counties
 Utah State Route 4 (1920s-1962), the former state highway designation (and some cases legislative overlay) for the multiple roads along what is now roughly the corridor for Interstate 80 in Utah, United States, that ran through Tooele, Salt Lake, and Summit counties

See also

 List of state highways in Utah
 List of Interstate Highways in Utah
 List of U.S. Highways in Utah
 List of named highway junctions in Utah
 List of highways numbered 4

External links

 Utah Department of Transportation Highway Resolutions: Route 4 (PDF)